Nasseneba Touré Diané is an Ivory Coast politician.

Diané is Minister of Women, Family and Children; mayor of the municipality of Odienné; and member of the Rally of Republicans (RDR).

References

21st-century Ivorian women politicians
21st-century Ivorian politicians
Living people
1972 births